Neath and District Tramways Company operated a tramway service in Neath between 1875 and 1897.

History

Neath and District Tramways Company began operating horse-drawn tramway services in Neath in 1875.

Closure

Neath Corporation took over the tramway in 1897 and formed Neath Corporation Tramways to modernise the service.

References

Tram transport in Wales